Balázs Birkás (born 12 April 1996) is a Hungarian sprint canoeist.

He participated at the 2018 ICF Canoe Sprint World Championships.

References

1996 births
Hungarian male canoeists
Living people
ICF Canoe Sprint World Championships medalists in kayak
Sportspeople from Szeged
Canoeists at the 2019 European Games
European Games medalists in canoeing
European Games silver medalists for Hungary
21st-century Hungarian people